The Bruce by-election, 1892 was a by-election held on 4 May 1892 during the 11th New Zealand Parliament in the rural lower South Island electorate of .

Background
The by-election was triggered after the resignation of sitting Member James William Thomson.

Results
The following table gives the election results:

Allen held the electorate until his own resignation in 1920 to become New Zealand's High Commissioner to the United Kingdom, which triggered another by-election.

Notes

References

Bruce 1892
1892 elections in New Zealand
Politics of Otago